Gillmeria ochrodactyla is a moth of the family Pterophoridae found in Asia and Europe. It was first described by the Austrian entomologists, Michael Denis & Ignaz Schiffermüller in 1775.

Description

The species was known as Gillmeria tetradactyla until recently, but is now known as Gillmeria ochrodactyla. Gillmeria tetradactyla is now an invalid name. Reason for this decision is to eliminate the confusion with Platyptilia tetradactyla.

G. ochrodactyla  has brown and white bands on its hindlegs below the middle spurs, whereas the legs of G pallidactyla are not banded. The moth is single-brooded, flying from late June to August, can be found resting on the flower-heads of the larval food plant, tansy (Tanacetum vulgare). After dark, the imago will come to light.

The larvae initially feed on tansy (Tanacetum vulgare) flowers in August, then mine down a shoot, and from November to March, diapause in the roots. In April the larvae eat in to a new-growth stem mining for about 2 cm, moves to a fresh position in the stem, or to a new stem to continue mining until early June.  Larvae can be found by searching for wilted stems, or for frass under leaf sheafs. G. pallidactyla larvae have been found on tansy but the mature larvae feed externally on the stem, rather than mining the stem.

Distribution
It is found in most of Europe and has recently been recorded from Iran and Tajikistan.

References

External links
Lepidoptera of Belgium
Microlepidoptera.nl 
Swedish Moths

Platyptiliini
Moths described in 1775
Moths of Asia
Moths of Europe
Taxa named by Michael Denis
Taxa named by Ignaz Schiffermüller